is a 2018 Japanese film adaptation of the manga series by Nanami Mao. A live-action film adaptation directed by Tsutomu Hanabusa and distributed by Warner Bros. was released in Japanese theaters on September 14, 2018. The theme song of the film, Bedtime Stories by Kana Nishino.

Cast
 Ayami Nakajo as Iroha Igarashi
 Hayato Sano as Hikari Tsutsui
 Hiroya Shimizu as Mitsuya Takanashi
 Yuri Tsunematsu as Ishino Arisa
 Moka Kamishiraishi as Sumie Ayado
 Yutaro as Yuto Ito
 Takahiro Miura as Shingo Mabuchi
 Sayaka Kanda as Ezomichi (voice)
 Mari Hamada as Tsutsui Norie
 Riki Takeuchi as Mitsuru Tsutsui

References

External links
 
  

2018 films
2010s children's films
2018 romance films
2010s teen romance films
Films about amnesia
Films based on children's books
Nippon TV films
Films set in Tokyo
2010s Japanese-language films
Japanese children's films
Japanese romance films
Japanese high school films
Live-action films based on manga
Warner Bros. films
2010s Japanese films